The 1999–2000 season was Ionikos' 6th straight season on the Greek first tier and the 9th season on that tier overall. Managing a lower league finish than the previous season, their biggest feat was reaching the domestic cup final.

Players

Squad

|}

Players who left during the season

|}

Managers
Konstantinos Polychroniou: 1 July 1999 – 7 October 1999
Sokratis Gemelos: 8 October 1999 – 6 March 2000
Oleg Blokhin: 7 March 2000 – end of season

Alpha Ethniki

League table

UEFA Cup

First round

References
Weltfussball

Ionikos F.C. seasons
Ionikos